Jaromír Zeman (born 12 August 1886, date of death unknown) was a Czech tennis player. He competed for Bohemia in two events at the 1912 Summer Olympics.

References

1886 births
Year of death missing
Czechoslovak male tennis players
Olympic tennis players of Bohemia
Tennis players at the 1912 Summer Olympics
Tennis players from Prague